Rose of Bethlehem is the third album and first Christmas album by CCM group Selah. It was released October 15, 2002 by Curb Records.

Critical reception

Andy Argyrakis of CCM Magazine gives the album four out of a possible five stars and writes, "anyone discovering these selections for the first time will surely delight in the vocal purity and inspirational arrangements throughout the title track, 'Silent Night', 'Light of the Stable' and 'Once Upon a Christmas' (which includes country great Dolly Parton)"

Crosswalk says in their review, "With Selah, there's definitely more than meets the eye.  The trio made up of two Smith siblings (Nicol and Todd) and one pianist (Allan Hall) may appear to be very average, normal folk at first glance.  But with one listen to the vocal group steadily building a loyal following sans pomp and circumstance, you'll soon know their talent is far from the norm.  And Rose of Bethlehem—their latest and first Christmas project—testifies to that fact."

Track listing

Charts

References

2002 Christmas albums
Selah (band) albums
Curb Records albums